Rajganj College, established in 2009, is a general degree college at Rajganj. It is in Jalpaiguri district. It offers undergraduate courses in arts. It is affiliated to  University of North Bengal.

Departments

Arts
Bengali
English
History
Political Science
Sociology
Education
Geography

See also

References

External links
Rajganj College
University of North Bengal
University Grants Commission
National Assessment and Accreditation Council

Universities and colleges in Jalpaiguri district
Colleges affiliated to University of North Bengal
Educational institutions established in 2009
2009 establishments in West Bengal